Sir George Jackson, 1st Baronet (1770 – 1846) was an Anglo-Irish politician. 

Jackson was the Member of Parliament for Coleraine in the Irish House of Commons between 1789 and 1796, before representing Randalstown from 1797 until the seat's disenfranchisement under the Acts of Union 1800. On 21 April 1813, he was created a baronet of Fort Hill in the Baronetage of the United Kingdom. The title became extinct upon his death in 1846.

References

1770 births
1846 deaths
18th-century Anglo-Irish people
19th-century Anglo-Irish people
Baronets in the Baronetage of the United Kingdom
Irish MPs 1783–1790
Irish MPs 1790–1797
Irish MPs 1798–1800
Members of the Parliament of Ireland (pre-1801) for County Antrim constituencies
Members of the Parliament of Ireland (pre-1801) for County Londonderry constituencies